The Battle of Siversk was a military engagement during the 2022 Russian invasion of Ukraine, as part of the battle of Donbas of the wider eastern Ukraine offensive, that began on 3 July 2022. Russian forces ceased launching assaults on and around Siversk on 28 July.

Background 

On 25 June, Russian forces captured Sievierodonetsk and the surrounding villages. Russian forces captured the twin city of Lysychansk on 2 July, fully capturing Luhansk Oblast. After completing one of the primary Russian goals in the Battle of Donbas, Russian and separatist forces stated they would be pushing towards northern Donetsk Oblast, with the next goals being the cities of Siversk and Bakhmut.

Battle 
On 3 July 2022, the LPR announced that fighting for Siversk had begun, although this claim was rejected by Ukraine and Western observers. Fighting intensified on 4 July for the villages of Verkhnokamyanske, Hryhorivka, Spirne, and especially Bilohorivka, the last town in Luhansk Oblast under Ukrainian control. Russian and LPR forces captured the village of Hryhorivka on 9 July, which the British Ministry of Defence confirmed on 12 July. On 11 July, Russian forces reached to just within a few kilometers of Siversk, although the Ukrainian General Staff claimed that a Russian assault on Spirne and Ivano-Darivka suffered serious losses. Russian and separatist media falsely claimed on 13–14 July that Russian forces had captured Siversk, although Ukrainian forces retained control of the town. On 15 July, Russian forces launched a failed attack on Verkhnokamyanske and Spirne.

Between 16–19 July, clashes began inside Ivano-Darivka, Bilohorivka, and Berestove. These battles spread to Spirne, Serebrianka, and Verkhnokamyanske on 19 July, with Ukrainian forces also falling back to the center of Hryhorivka. Throughout July and August, these towns switched between Russian and Ukrainian control multiple times, with Russian forces launching numerous failed ground assaults in the direction of Siversk. The fighting resulted in a stalemate, with Russian forces being unable to make any territorial gains after 24 July. On 28 July, Russian forces reportedly did not conduct any assaults towards Siversk for the first time since the battle began.

On 7 September, units of the 80th Air Assault Brigade and the Ukraine's Donbas Battalion reportedly pushed the line of contact back to the outskirts of Verkhno'kamyanka in Luhansk Oblast. On 9 September, Russian forces did not conduct any attacks on Siversk for the first time since July, having withdrawn from their positions surrounding the town.

Casualties 
Four foreign volunteers—two Americans, one Canadian, and one Swede—fighting for Ukraine were killed by tank fire on 22 July during an attempt to clear Russian forces out of a ravine near Siversk, according to territorial defense forces commander Ruslan Miroshnichenko.

The head of the military administration of the Donetsk Oblast reported 30 Russian soldiers killed in a raid in the peripheral area on 28 July, while also claiming that Russian losses were constantly increasing.

According to a senior DPR official, Ukrainian casualties since the beginning of the battle were over 29 soldiers killed and at least 100 wounded. The same officer later attributes these  losses to accurate multiple rocket launcher strikes by Russian and separatist forces.

Analysis 
On 20 July, the Institute for the Study of War (ISW) stated that the Russian grouping in the Siversk area was likely still severely degraded by recent operations to complete the capture of the Luhansk Oblast and was therefore only making slow and grinding progress towards Siversk, and that they were continuing to degrade their own offensive combat power in localized fights for small and relatively unimportant settlements. It was also stated that Russian troops were struggling to move across relatively sparsely-settled and open terrain, and would encounter terrain much more conducive to the Ukrainian defenders the closer they would get to the E40 around Slovyansk and Bakhmut due to the increasing population density and built-up nature of those areas. The ISW concluded that the current Russian offensive in Donbas would likely to culminate somewhere along the E40 in the following weeks.

According to the ISW, the language of the Ukrainian General Staff's report on 23 July suggested that Russian forces may be advancing closer to the outskirts of Siversk proper from positions in the east.

On 28 July, the ISW stated that Russian forces may be de-emphasizing attempts to take Siversk in order to concentrate on Bakhmut, as they have been struggling to make concrete gains around Siversk and have not made any confirmed advances toward the city since the capture of the Luhansk Oblast Administrative border in early July. The ISW concluded that Russian command is likely seeking to maintain momentum around Bakhmut, potentially at the expense of continued pressure on Siversk.

On 30 July, President Zelenskyy ordered all Ukrainian civilians in the Donetsk region to evacuate. Between 200,000 and 220,000 civilians still lived in the unoccupied area of Donetsk Oblast, according to Ukrainian estimates. According to Zelenskyy the evacuation responded to the lack of heat and energy needs for the incoming winter season.

See also 
 Outline of the Russo-Ukrainian War

References

Battles of the 2022 Russian invasion of Ukraine
July 2022 events in Ukraine
August 2022 events in Ukraine
September 2022 events in Ukraine
Eastern Ukraine offensive
Battles of the war in Donbas
Battles involving the Donetsk People's Republic
History of Donetsk Oblast
Battle